During the Second World War, Operation Collar was  a small, fast three-ship convoy that left Britain on 12 November 1940 and passed Gibraltar on 24 November, escorted by two cruisers for Malta and Alexandria.

This group was commanded by Vice Admiral Lancelot Holland.

The convoy was covered at a distance to the north by a much stronger naval force – "Force H", commanded by Admiral James Somerville.

The Italians were aware of this operation and despatched a strong naval force (2 battleships, 6 cruisers, 14 destroyers) under Admiral Inigo Campioni to intercept it. They were themselves met by the covering force, "Force H", and the Battle of Cape Spartivento ensued. The Italian fleet's orders barred it from a decisive encounter. The Italian destroyer Lanciere and the British cruiser HMS Berwick were seriously damaged during the exchange of fire.

After the battle, Admiral Somerville’s "Force H" continued towards Malta until late afternoon on the 27th when, just before Cape Bon, they returned to Gibraltar. At midnight on 28 November, the convoy passed Cape Bon and set course to rendezvous with Admiral Andrew Cunningham’s forces from Alexandria. This small convoy was also covered by the cruisers HMS Manchester and Southampton.

See also
 Battle of the Mediterranean
 Malta Convoys
 Battle of Cape Spartivento

Collar
Collar
1940 in Europe